Scleria robinsoniana is a plant in the nutrush genus Scleria of the sedge family Cyperaceae.

Distribution and habitat
Scleria robinsoniana grows naturally in Guinea, Sierra Leone and the Central African Republic. Its habitat is seasonally wet stony areas from sea-level to  altitude.

References

robinsoniana
Flora of Guinea
Flora of Sierra Leone
Flora of the Central African Republic
Plants described in 1967